The following is a partial list of articles for state schools in the unitary council areas of City of Aberdeen, City of Dundee, City of Edinburgh and City of Glasgow in Scotland, United Kingdom.

You may also find :Category:Schools in Scotland of use to find a particular school. See also the List of the oldest schools in the United Kingdom.

By unitary council area.

Note that the allocations to address and council area may not be accurate in every case and you can help if you have access to local directories.

City of Aberdeen 
see also List of schools in Aberdeen

Primary schools 

 Abbotswell School
 Airyhall School
 Ashley Road School
 Braehead School
 Bramble Brae School
 Brimmond School
 Broomhill School
 Charleston School
 Cornhill School
 Culter School
 Cults School
 Danestone School
 Dyce School
 Fernielea School
 Ferryhill School
 Forehill School
 Gilcomstoun School
 Glashieburn School
 Greenbrae School
 Hanover Street School
 Hazlehead School
 Heathryburn School
 Holy Family RC School
 Kaimhill School
 Kingsford School
 Kingswells School
 Kirkhill School
 Kittybrewster School
 Loirston School
 Manor Park School
 Middleton Park School
 Mile-End School
 Milltimber School
 Muirfield School
 Quarryhill School
 Riverbank School
 Scotstown School
 Seaton School
 Skene Square School
 St Joseph's R.C. School
 St Peter's RC School
 Stoneywood School
 Sunnybank School
 Tullos School
 Walker Road School
 Westpark School
 Woodside School

Secondary schools

Aberdeen Grammar School
Bridge of Don Academy
Bucksburn Academy
Cults Academy
Dyce Academy
Harlaw Academy
Hazlehead Academy
Lochside Academy
Northfield Academy
Oldmachar Academy
St Machar Academy

City of Dundee 

see also List of schools in Dundee

Primary schools

Ancrum Road Primary School
Ardler Primary School
Ballumbie Primary School
Barnhill Primary School
Blackness Primary School
Camperdown Primary School
Claypotts Castle Primary School
Clepington Primary School
Craigiebarns Primary School
Craigowl Primary School
Dens Road Primary School
Downfield Primary School
Eastern Primary School
Fintry Primary School
Forthill Primary School
Glebelands Primary School
Longhaugh Primary School
Mill of Mains Primary School
Our Lady's RC Primary School
Rosebank Primary School
Rowantree Primary School
Sidlaw View Primary School
SS Peter & Paul RC Primary School
St Andrew's RC Primary School 
St Clement's RC Primary School
St Francis RC Primary School
St Fergus' RC Primary School
St Joseph's RC Primary School
St Mary's RC Primary School
St Ninian's RC Primary School
St Pius RC Primary School
Tayview Primary School
Victoria Park Primary School

Secondary schools

Baldragon Academy
Braeview Academy
Craigie High School
Grove Academy
Harris Academy
Morgan Academy
St John's Roman Catholic High School
St Paul's Roman Catholic Academy

City of Edinburgh 

see also List of schools in Edinburgh

Primary schools 

Abbeyhill Primary School
Balgreen Primary School
Blackhall Primary School
Bonaly Primary School
Broomhouse Primary School
Broughton Primary School
Brunstane Primary School
Bruntsfield Primary School
Buckstone Primary School
Canaan Lane Primary School
Canal View Primary School
Carrick Knowe Primary School
Castleview Primary School
Clermiston Primary School
Clovenstone Primary School
Colinton Primary School
Corstorphine Primary School
Craigentinny Primary School
Craiglockhart Primary School
Craigour Park Primary School
Craigroyston Primary School
Cramond Primary School
Currie Primary School
Dalmeny Primary School
Dalry Primary School
Davidson's Mains Primary School
Dean Park Primary School
Duddingston Primary School
East Craigs Primary School
Echline Primary School
Ferryhill Primary School
Flora Stevenson Primary School
Forthview Primary School
Fox Covert Primary School
Frogston Primary School
Gilmerton Primary School
Gracemount Primary School
Granton Primary School
Gylemuir Primary School
Hermitage Park Primary School
Hillwood Primary School
Holy Cross RC Primary School
James Gillespie's Primary School
Juniper Green Primary School
Kirkliston Primary School
Leith Primary School
Leith Walk Primary School
Liberton Primary School
Longstone Primary School
Lorne Primary School
Murrayburn Primary School
Nether Currie Primary School
Newcraighall Primary School
Niddrie Mill Primary School
Oxgangs Primary School
Parsons Green Primary School
Pentland Primary School
Pirniehall Primary School
Preston Street Primary School
Prestonfield Primary School
Queensferry Primary School
Ratho Primary School
Roseburn Primary School
Royal Mile Primary School
Sciennes Primary School
Sighthill Primary School
South Morningside Primary School
St Andrew's Fox Covert RC Primary School
St Catherine's RC Primary School
St Cuthbert's RC Primary School
St David's RC Primary School
St Francis' RC Primary School
St John Vianney RC Primary School
St John's RC Primary School
St Joseph's RC Primary School
St Margaret's RC Primary School
St Mark's RC Primary School
St Mary's RC Primary School (Edinburgh)
St Mary's RC Primary School (Leith)
St Ninian's RC Primary School
St Peter's RC Primary School
Stenhouse Primary School
Stockbridge Primary School
The Royal High Primary School
Tollcross Primary School
Towerbank Primary School
Trinity Primary School
Victoria Primary School
Wardie Primary School

Secondary schools

 Balerno Community High School
 Boroughmuir High School
 Broughton High School
 Castlebrae Community High School
 Craigmount High School
 Craigroyston Community High School
 Currie Community High School
 Drummond Community High School
 Firrhill High School
 Forrester High School
 Gracemount High School
 Holy Rood High School
 James Gillespie's High School
 Leith Academy
 Liberton High School
 Portobello High School
 Queensferry High School
 St Augustine's High School
 St Thomas of Aquin's High School
 The Royal High School
 Trinity Academy
 Tynecastle High School
 Wester Hailes Education Centre

Special schools

Braidburn School
Edinburgh Secure Services (Howdenhall)
Gorgie Mills School
Kaimes School
Oaklands School
Pilrig Park School
Prospect Bank School
Redhall School
Rowanfield School
St Crispin's School
Woodlands School

City of Glasgow

Primary schools

 Alexandra Parade Primary School
 Anderston Primary School
 Annette Street Primary School
 Antonine Primary School
 Ashpark Primary School
 Aultmore Park Primary School
 Avenue End Primary School
 Balornock Primary School
 Bankhead Primary School
 Barmulloch Primary School
 Battlefield Primary School
 Blackfriars Primary School
 Blairdardie Primary School
 Broomhill Primary School
 Broomlea Primary School
 Bun-sgoil Ghàidhlig Bhaile a’ Ghobhainn (Govan Gaelic Primary School)
 Cadder Primary School
 Caldercuilt Primary School
 Caledonia Primary School
 Camstradden Primary School
 Cardonald Primary School
 Carmunnock Primary School
 Carmyle Primary School
 Carntyne Primary School
 Castleton Primary School
 Chirnsyde Primary School
 Cleeves Primary School
 Clyde Primary School
 Corpus Christi Primary School
 Crookston Castle Primary School
 Craigton Primary School
 Cranhill Primary School
 Croftcroighn Primary School
 Croftfoot Primary School
 Cuthbertson Primary School
 Dalmarnock Primary School
 Darnley Primary School and Visual Impairment Unit
 Drummore Primary School
 Dunard Primary School
 Eastbank Primary School
 Eastmuir Primary School
 Elmvale Primary School
 Garnetbank Primary School
 Garrowhill Primary School
 Glasgow Gaelic School/ Sgoil Ghàidhlig Ghlaschu
 Glendale Gaelic Primary School
 Glendale Primary School
 Golfhill Primary School
 Gowanbank Primary School
 Haghill Park Primary School
 Hampden Primary School
 Highpark Primary School
 Hillhead Primary School
 Hillington Primary School
 Holy Cross Primary School
 Howford Primary School
 Hyndland Primary School
 Ibrox Primary School
 John Paul II Primary School
 Kelbourne Park Primary School
 Kelvindale Primary School
 King's Park Primary School
 Kirkriggs Primary School
 Knightswood Primary School
 Langfaulds Primary School
 Langlands Primary School
 Langside Primary School
 Lorne Street Primary School
 Lourdes Primary School
 Merrylee Primary School
 Miller Primary School
 Miltonbank Primary School
 Mosspark Primary School
 Mount Florida Primary School
 Mount Vernon Primary School
 Notre Dame Primary School
 Oakgrove Primary School
 Oakwood Primary School
 Our Lady of the Annunciation Primary School
 Our Lady of Peace Primary School
 Our Lady of the Rosary Primary School
 Parkview Primary School
 Pirie Park Primary
 Pollokshields Primary School
 Quarry Brae Primary School
 Riverbank Primary School 
 Riverside Primary School
 Royston Primary School
 Sacred Heart Primary School
 Sandaig Primary School
 Sandwood Primary School
 Saracen Primary School
 Scotstoun Primary School
 Shawlands Primary School
 Sunnyside Primary School
 Swinton Primary School
 St Albert's Primary School
 St Angela's Primary School
 St Anne's Primary School
 St Bartholomew's Primary School
 St Benedict's Primary School
 St Bernard's Primary School
 St Blane's Primary School
 St Brendan's Primary School
 St Bride's Primary School
 St Brigid's Primary School
 St Bridget's Primary School
 St Catherine's Primary School
 St Charles' Primary School
 St Clare's Primary School
 St Constantine's Primary School
 St Conval's Primary School
 St Cuthbert's Primary School
 St Denis' Primary School
 St Fillan's Primary School
 St Francis' Primary School
 St Francis of Assisi Primary School
 St George's Primary School
 St Joachim's Primary School
 St Joseph's Primary School
 St Kevin's Primary School
 St Marnock's Primary School
 St Martha's Primary School
 St Mary's Primary School
 St Maria Goretti Primary School
 St Michael's Primary School
 St Mirin's Primary School
 St Monica's (Pollok) Primary School
 St Monica's (Milton) Primary School
 St Mungo's Primary School
 St Ninian's Primary School
 St Patrick's Primary School
 St Paul's (Shettleston) Primary School
 St Paul's (Whiteinch) Primary School
 St Philomena's Primary School
 St Roch's Primary School
 St Rose of Lima Primary School
 St Saviour's Primary School
 St Stephen's Primary School
 St Teresa's Primary School
 St Thomas' Primary School
 St Timothy's Primary School
 St Vincent's Primary School
 Thorntree Primary School
 Thornwood Primary School
 Tinto Primary School
 Toryglen Primary School
 Wallacewell Primary School
 Wellshot Primary School
 Whiteinch Primary School

Secondary schools

 Non-denominational schools

 Abercorn Secondary School
 Bannerman High School
 Bellahouston Academy
 Cartvale Secondary School
 Castlemilk High School
 Cleveden Secondary School
 Drumchapel High School
 Eastbank Academy
 Govan High School
 Hillhead High School
 Hillpark Secondary School
 Hollybrook Academy
 Hyndland Secondary School
 King's Park Secondary School
 Knightswood Secondary School
 Linburn Academy
 Lochend Community High School
 Parkhill Secondary School
 Rosshall Academy
 Shawlands Academy
 Smithycroft Secondary School
 Springburn Academy
 Trinity High School
 Whitehill Secondary School

 Roman Catholic schools

 All Saints Secondary School
 Cardinal Winning Secondary School
 Holyrood Secondary School
 John Paul Academy
 Lourdes Secondary School
 Notre Dame High School
 St Andrew's Secondary School
 St Margaret Mary's Secondary School
 St Mungo's Academy
 St Oswald's Secondary School
 St Paul's High School
 St Roch's Secondary School
 St Thomas Aquinas Secondary School

Gaelic School
Glasgow Gaelic School (Sgoil Ghàidhlig Ghlaschu)

Special schools 

 Easterhouse
Newhills School

Area unspecified

Special schools

Ladywell School

See also
List of independent schools in Scotland
List of state schools in Scotland (council areas excluding cities, A–D)
List of state schools in Scotland (council areas excluding cities, E–H)
List of state schools in Scotland (council areas excluding cities, I–R)
List of state schools in Scotland (council areas excluding cities, S–W)
List of Catholic schools in Scotland
Education in the United Kingdom
Education in Scotland
Education Scotland

External links
The website UK Schools & Colleges Database lists currently operating state (and some independent) schools by Local Education Authority and also links to websites of individual schools where available.

State schools
Schools in Scotland by council area